There are six video game adaptations of the television series Buffy the Vampire Slayer that have been released. Although having been licensed as Buffy the Vampire Slayer merchandise, these games and spin-offs are generally not considered as part of the Buffyverse canon.

List

See also
Buffyverse role-playing games
Buffy the Vampire Slayer Collectible Card Game

References

 *
Video game franchises
Video games featuring female protagonists